Pterostylis macilenta is a plant in the orchid family Orchidaceae and is endemic to the Grampians National Park in Victoria. As with similar greenhoods, flowering plants differ from those that are not flowering. The non-flowering plants have a rosette  of leaves flat on the ground but the flowering plants have up to six translucent, dark green flowers and lack a rosette.

Description
Pterostylis macilenta, is a terrestrial,  perennial, deciduous, herb with an underground tuber. The galea is translucent dark green with darker green stripes. Flowering occurs from September to December.

Taxonomy and naming
This greenhood was first formally described in 2006 by David Jones and given the name Bunochilus macilentus. The description was published in Australian Orchid Research from a specimen collected on Mount William in the Grampians National Park. In 2007, Gary Backhouse changed the name to Pterostylis macilenta. The specific epithet (macilenta) is derived from a Latin word meaning "lean", "thin" or "poor", referring to the narrow labellum.

Distribution and habitat
Pterostylis macilenta is only known from the Grampians National Park where it grows with shrubs in moist forest.

References

macilenta
Endemic orchids of Australia
Orchids of Victoria (Australia)
Plants described in 2006